Bang Khun Thian is one of the 50 districts (khet) of Bangkok, Thailand. Its neighbors, clockwise from the north, are Bang Bon, Chom Thong, and Thung Khru Districts of Bangkok, Phra Samut Chedi district of Samut Prakan province and Mueang Samut Sakhon district of Samut Sakhon province. Bang Khun Thian is Bangkok's southernmost district, and the only one bordering the Bay of Bangkok (upper Gulf of Thailand).

History
Bang Khun Thian is an old district, believed to have been established in 1867 as an amphoe of Thonburi.

In 1972, Thonburi and Phra Nakhon Provinces were combined into Bangkok metropolis. Administrative units in the newly combined capital province were renamed from amphoe and tambon to "district" (khet) and "sub-district" (khwaeng). Thus, Bang Khun Thian became a district of Bangkok, composed of seven sub-districts: Bang Khun Thian, Bang Kho, Chom Thong, Bang Mot, Tha Kham, Bang Bon, and Samae Dam.

Due to population increases, a portion of Bang Khun Thian district was set up with its own district office and called Bang Khun Thian Branch 1. This new unit oversaw four sub-districts: Bang Khun Thian, Bang Kho, Bang Mot, and Chom Thong. In 1989, Bang Khun Thian Branch 1 was made a full district called Chom Thong District. In 1997, Bang Bon sub-district was separated from Bang Khun Thian and became its own district.

Economy
Bang Khun Thian (Bangkhuntien), particularly its Tha Kham Sub-district, is a centre of seafood aquaculture, mostly shrimp. Most of Tha Kam's residents—70 to 80%—are aquaculture farmers and aquaculture occupies much of the district's land area. The industry is jeopardised by coastal erosion—the shoreline has retreated more than a kilometre since 1952—and since 2009, wastewater pollution has negatively impacted cultivation and farmer incomes have declined by 30–90 percent.

Administration
The district is divided into two sub-districts (khwaeng).

Places

Bang Khun Thian has Bangkok's only seashore. The coastline, about five km long, is muddy, containing mangrove forests and shrimp farms. The only way to access the Bay of Bangkok is via boat. A group of crab-eating macaque (Macaca fascicularis, Thai ลิงแสม), a kind of monkey, inhabits the coast near the sea. A fishing community is located there and the sea coast is known for its seafood restaurants.

Besides, Bang Khun Thian's mangrove forests are also the habitat for the last group of smooth-coated otters (Lutrogale perspicillata, Thai นากใหญ่ขนเรียบ) in Bangkok.

Important temples in the district include Wat Kamphaeng (วัดกำแพง), Wat Kok (วัดกก), Wat Tha Kham (วัดท่าข้าม), Wat Hua Krabue (วัดหัวกระบือ), and Wat Bang Kradi (วัดบางกระดี่).

Bang Kradi in Samae Dam is reputed to be the residence of Thai Mon people.

CentralPlaza Rama II is only large shopping mall in the district.

Taweethapisek Bangkhunthain School (a branch of Taweethapisek School) and Khlong Pittayalongkorn School are the dominant schools in the area.

References

External links
 District website (Thai only)
 BMA website with the tourist landmarks of Bang Khun Thian

 
Districts of Bangkok